St Philip and St James Church may refer to:

 St Philip and St James Church, Ilfracombe, England
 St Philip and St James Church, Leckhampton, England
 Church of St Philip and St James, Norton St Philip, England
 St Philip and St James Church, Oxford, England
 St Philip and St James' Church, Plaistow, England
 St Philip and St James Church, Whitton, England
 St. Philip and St. James Church, Booterstown, Dublin, Ireland